Andrey Rublev was the defending champion, but chose to compete in St. Petersburg instead.

Alexander Zverev won the title, defeating Frances Tiafoe in the final, 7–5, 6–4.

Seeds

Draw

Finals

Top half

Bottom half

Qualifying

Seeds

Qualifiers

Lucky loser

Qualifying draw

First qualifier

Second qualifier

Third qualifier

Fourth qualifier

References

External links
 Main draw
 Qualifying draw

Erste Bank Open - Singles
2021 Singles